491st may refer to:

491st Bombardment Group, inactive United States Army Air Force unit
491st Bombardment Squadron, inactive United States Air Force unit
491st Fighter-Bomber Squadron, inactive United States Air Force unit

See also
491 (number)
491, the year 491 (CDXCI) of the Julian calendar
491 BC